In seven-dimensional geometry, a rectified 7-orthoplex is a convex uniform 7-polytope, being a rectification of the regular 7-orthoplex.

There are unique 7 degrees of rectifications, the zeroth being the 7-orthoplex, and the 6th and last being the 7-cube. Vertices of the rectified 7-orthoplex are located at the edge-centers of the 7-orthoplex. Vertices of the birectified 7-orthoplex are located in the triangular face centers of the 7-orthoplex. Vertices of the trirectified 7-orthoplex are located in the tetrahedral cell centers of the 7-orthoplex.

Rectified 7-orthoplex 

The rectified 7-orthoplex is the vertex figure for the demihepteractic honeycomb. The rectified 7-orthoplex's 84 vertices represent the kissing number of a sphere-packing constructed from this honeycomb.
 or

Alternate names
 rectified heptacross
 rectified hecatonicosoctaexon (Acronym rez) (Jonathan Bowers) - rectified 128-faceted polyexon

Images

Construction 

There are two Coxeter groups associated with the rectified heptacross, one with the C7 or [4,3,3,3,3,3] Coxeter group, and a lower symmetry with two copies of pentacross facets, alternating, with the D7 or [34,1,1] Coxeter group.

Cartesian coordinates 
Cartesian coordinates for the vertices of a rectified heptacross, centered at the origin, edge length  are all permutations of:
 (±1,±1,0,0,0,0,0)

Root vectors 

Its 84 vertices represent the root vectors of the simple Lie group D7. The vertices can be seen in 3 hyperplanes, with the 21 vertices rectified 6-simplexs cells on opposite sides, and 42 vertices of an expanded 6-simplex passing through the center.  When combined with the 14 vertices of the 7-orthoplex, these vertices represent the 98 root vectors of the B7 and C7 simple Lie groups.

Birectified 7-orthoplex

Alternate names
 Birectified heptacross
 Birectified hecatonicosoctaexon (Acronym barz) (Jonathan Bowers) - birectified 128-faceted polyexon

Images

Cartesian coordinates 
Cartesian coordinates for the vertices of a birectified 7-orthoplex, centered at the origin, edge length  are all permutations of:
 (±1,±1,±1,0,0,0,0)

Trirectified 7-orthoplex 
A trirectified 7-orthoplex is the same as a trirectified 7-cube.

Notes

References
 H.S.M. Coxeter: 
 H.S.M. Coxeter, Regular Polytopes, 3rd Edition, Dover New York, 1973 
 Kaleidoscopes: Selected Writings of H.S.M. Coxeter, edited by F. Arthur Sherk, Peter McMullen, Anthony C. Thompson, Asia Ivic Weiss, Wiley-Interscience Publication, 1995,  
 (Paper 22) H.S.M. Coxeter, Regular and Semi Regular Polytopes I, [Math. Zeit. 46 (1940) 380-407, MR 2,10]
 (Paper 23) H.S.M. Coxeter, Regular and Semi-Regular Polytopes II, [Math. Zeit. 188 (1985) 559-591]
 (Paper 24) H.S.M. Coxeter, Regular and Semi-Regular Polytopes III, [Math. Zeit. 200 (1988) 3-45]
 Norman Johnson Uniform Polytopes, Manuscript (1991)
 N.W. Johnson: The Theory of Uniform Polytopes and Honeycombs, Ph.D. 
  o3x3o3o3o3o4o - rez, o3o3x3o3o3o4o - barz

External links 
 Polytopes of Various Dimensions
 Multi-dimensional Glossary

7-polytopes